Samuel Usque (Lisbon, c.1500 - after 1555 in Italy or Palestine) was a Portuguese converso Jewish author who settled in Ferrara.

His major work is the Consolação às Tribulações de Israel ("Consolation for the Tribulations of Israel"), Ferrara, 1553. He appears to be the only one of the contemporaries of Solomon ibn Verga to have made use of the latter's Sceptre of Judah.

He is credited with coining the epithet "Mother of Israel" (Judaeo-Spanish: Madre de Israel) for the Greek city of Thessaloniki.

References

Portuguese male writers
Portuguese Renaissance writers
1500s births
16th-century deaths
People from Lisbon
16th-century Portuguese writers
Jewish Portuguese writers